The Cadillac Cien is a 2-door rear mid-engined, rear-wheel-drive high performance concept car created by Cadillac, designed by Simon Cox, and unveiled at the 2002 Detroit Auto Show to celebrate Cadillac's 100th anniversary ("cien" is Spanish for one hundred, which compares the Buick Centieme).

Overview 
This experimental engine featured direct injection and displacement on demand, which allowed the engine to run on only eight or fewer cylinders under light load. The Cien was designed at General Motors' Advanced Design Studio in England and built as a fully working road-going vehicle with the help of the UK-based engineering and motorsport company Prodrive. The Cien's monocoque chassis and body are made of aerogel composite, and it is equipped with active aero. Its design was inspired by the F-22 Raptor.

Initially, there were plans to put it into production, but due to the lack of development funds and the high expected selling price of US$200,000, the very existence of a customer base for the Cien was put into question. The production of the Cien was thus formally cancelled in a board meeting.

Media 
It was featured in the 2005 film The Island and the 2014 film Transformers: Age of Extinction.
It was also a car in Midnight Club 3 (a 2005 game for Xbox and PS2), the Gran Turismo games Gran Turismo Concept (a PS2 game released in 2001 - 2002) 4 (a PS2 game released in 2004), PSP, 5, and 6 and Asphalt 9: Legends.

References

External links 
Jalopnik - David Carradine Wanted To Drive A Cadillac Cien In Kill Bill 2

Rear mid-engine, rear-wheel-drive vehicles
Cien
Cars introduced in 2002
Sports cars
Coupés